See:
 Market houses in Northern Ireland
 List of market houses in the Republic of Ireland

Market House
Market House
Irish
Market